Edgar Russell Fiedler (April 21, 1929 – March 15, 2003) was an American economist.

Biography
Fiedler was born in Milwaukee, Wisconsin, and later lived in Scarsdale, New York, and Chapel Hill, North Carolina. He was a 1951 graduate of the University of Wisconsin. He received an M.B.A. at the University of Michigan in 1956, and a Ph.D. in economics from New York University in 1970.

He served as Assistant Secretary of the Treasury for Economic Policy from 1971 to 1975 during the presidencies of Richard Nixon and Gerald Ford.  He authored The Roots of Stagflation.

He served as Vice President, economic counselor, senior fellow and adviser of The Conference Board, a business research organization in Manhattan, which he first joined in 1975.  He edited its monthly publication, Economic Times.

In the 1980s he was an adjunct professor of economics at the Columbia Graduate School of Business. He authored The Roots of Stagflation (1984). 

He wrote the following wry rules for economic forecasters: “If you must forecast, forecast often. And if you’re ever right, never let ’em forget it.”

References

External links 
Saxon, Wolfgang. "Edgar Russell Fiedler, 73, Economist and Treasury Aide." The New York Times. A27. March 19, 2003.

2003 deaths
1929 births
20th-century American economists
Columbia Business School faculty
New York University alumni
People from Chapel Hill, North Carolina
People from Milwaukee
People from Scarsdale, New York
Ross School of Business alumni
United States Assistant Secretaries of the Treasury
University of Michigan alumni
University of Wisconsin–Madison alumni